The 1936 season was the twenty-fifth season for Santos FC.

References

External links
Official Site 

Santos
1936
1936 in Brazilian football